Feminist Theology is a peer-reviewed academic journal that publishes papers four times a year in the field of Theology. The journal's editors are Lisa Isherwood (University of Winchester), Lillalou Hughes, Beverley Clack (Westminster Institute of Education) and Janet Wootton. It has been in publication since 1992 and is published by SAGE Publications in association with the Britain and Ireland School of Feminist Theology (BISFT).

Scope 
Feminist Theology, whilst academic in its orientation, aims to be seen as accessible to a wide range of readers, whether theologically trained or not. The journal provides a forum for the discussion of contemporary issues in a practical perspective.

Abstracting and indexing 
Feminist Theory is abstracted and indexed in the following databases:
 ATLA Religion Database
 Index Theologicus
 New Testament Abstracts
 Religion & Philosophy Collection
 SCOPUS

External links 
 

Feminist theology
SAGE Publishing academic journals
English-language journals
Religious studies journals
Publications established in 1992
Quarterly journals